The Masses is a magazine of socialist politics published monthly in the U.S. from 1911 until 1917.

The Masses may also refer to:

 Commoners, the main toiling part a population
 The Masses (Egyptian newspaper), a communist weekly newspaper
 The Masses (Thai newspaper), a communist weekly newspaper
 The Masses (collective), a visual arts, movie, and music collective

See also
 Mass (disambiguation)
 Multitude (disambiguation)